James Albert Rosenquist (November 29, 1933 – March 31, 2017) was an American artist and one of the proponents of the pop art movement. Drawing from his background working in sign painting, Rosenquist's pieces often explored the role of advertising and consumer culture in art and society, utilizing techniques he learned making commercial art to depict popular cultural icons and mundane everyday objects. While his works have often been compared to those from other key figures of the pop art movement, such as Andy Warhol and Roy Lichtenstein, Rosenquist's pieces were unique in the way that they often employed elements of surrealism using fragments of advertisements and cultural imagery to emphasize the overwhelming nature of ads. He was a 2001 inductee into the Florida Artists Hall of Fame.

Early life
Rosenquist was born on November 29, 1933, in Grand Forks, North Dakota, the only child of Louis and Ruth Rosenquist. His parents were amateur pilots of Swedish descent who moved from town to town to look for work, finally settling in Minneapolis, Minnesota. His mother, who was also a painter, encouraged her son to have an artistic interest. In junior high school, Rosenquist won a short-term scholarship to study at the Minneapolis School of Art and subsequently studied painting at the University of Minnesota from 1952 to 1954.  In 1955, at the age of 21, he moved to New York City on scholarship to study at the Art Students League, studying under painters such as Edwin Dickinson and George Grosz. Talking about his experience at the Art Students League, Rosenquist said "I studied only with the abstract artists. They had commercial artists there teaching commercial work, I didn't bother with that. I was only interested in – see, here's how it started. I was interested in learning how to paint the Sistine Chapel. It sounds ambitious, but I wanted to go to mural school". While studying in New York, Rosenquist took up a job as a chauffeur, before deciding to join the International Brotherhood of Painters and Allied Trades.  As a member of the union, Rosenquist would paint billboards around Times Square, ultimately becoming the lead painter for Artkraft‐Strauss and painting displays and windows across Fifth Avenue. By 1960, Rosenquist abandoned painting signs after a friend died by falling from scaffolding on the job. Instead of working on commercial pieces, he chose to focus on personal projects in his own studio, developing his own distinct style of painting that retained the kind of imagery, bold hues, and scale that he utilized while he painted billboards.

Career

Rosenquist's career in commercial art began when he was 18, after his mother encouraged him to pursue a summer job painting. He started by painting Phillips 66 signs, going to gas stations from North Dakota to Wisconsin. After leaving school, Rosenquist took a series of odd jobs and then turned to sign painting. From 1957 to 1960, Rosenquist earned his living as a billboard painter. Rosenquist applied sign-painting techniques to the large-scale paintings he began creating in 1960. Like other pop artists, Rosenquist adapted the visual language of advertising and pop culture to the context of fine art.
"I painted billboards above every candy store in Brooklyn. "I got so I could paint a Schenley whiskey bottle in my sleep", he wrote in his 2009 autobiography, Painting Below Zero: Notes on a Life in Art. Time magazine stated that "his powerful graphic style and painted montages helped define the 1960s Pop Art movement."

In 2003, art critic Peter Schjeldahl asked of Rosenquist's application of sign painting techniques to fine art thus: "[W]as importing the method into art a bit of a cheap trick? So were Warhol's photo silk-screening and Lichtenstein's lining of panels from comic strips. The goal in all cases was to fuse painting aesthetics with the semiotics of media-drenched contemporary reality. The naked efficiency of anti-personal artmaking defines classic Pop. It's as if someone were inviting you to inspect the fist with which he simultaneously punches you."

Rosenquist had his first two solo exhibitions at the Green Gallery in 1962 and 1963. He exhibited his painting F-111, a room-scale painting, at the Leo Castelli Gallery in 1965, with which he achieved international acclaim.

But Rosenquist said the following about his involvement in the Pop Art movement: "They [art critics] called me a Pop artist because I used recognizable imagery. The critics like to group people together. I didn't meet Andy Warhol until 1964. I did not really know Andy or Roy Lichtenstein that well. We all emerged separately."

In 1971 Rosenquist came to South Florida after receiving an offer from Donald Saff, dean of the University of South Florida's College of Fine Arts, to participate in the school's Graphicstudio, a collaborative art initiative.  In the years following Rosenquist remained a key contributor to the studio, cooperating with students and other artists and producing numerous works of his own, ultimately creating his Aripeka studio in 1976. Rosenquist would continue to travel to Florida throughout his career with the artist developing several commissioned works for the community including two murals for Florida's state capitol building and a sculpture for Johns Hopkins All Children's Hospital, in addition to serving on the Tampa Museum of Art's Board of Trustees.

Rosenquist's paintings have been on display in the lobby of Key Tower in Cleveland, Ohio. His F-111 was displayed there for many years.

After his acclaim, Rosenquist produced large-scale commissions. This includes the three-painting suite The Swimmer in the Econo-mist (1997–1998) for Deutsche Guggenheim, Berlin, Germany, and a painting that was planned for the ceiling of the Palais de Chaillot in Paris, France.

Works 
Zone: A key work in the development of his signature style, Rosenquist cites his 1961 work Zone as a turning point in the development of his own personal aesthetic, with the piece being the first to employ monumental scale, a recurring aspect of Rosenquist's art that is exemplified in his many murals. Zone also served as a stepping stone in Rosenquist's body of work in that it served as a departure from his previous works, which saw him move away from previous experiments in Abstract Expressionism, with the picture being described by Rosenquist as his first pop piece. Done in oil on two separate  pieces of canvas, the work exemplifies the beginnings of the pop art movement in the way that Rosenquist takes imagery from mass media, using a picture of a tomato and a clipping from an ad for hand cream. The two images are divided into separate zones, which serve to focus on visual parallels such as the arch of the tomato stem and the woman's eyelashes, as well as illustrating Rosenquist's signature, often surreal, fragmented composition.

President Elect: Released the same year as Zone, James Rosenquist's President Elect is among one his most well-known pieces, with the artist translating a portrait of John F. Kennedy from a campaign poster onto a towering display. The painting also includes a superimposed picture of hand holding cake in greyscale, as well as the back of a Chevrolet. Rosenquist uses icons in pop culture to examine fame and the relationship between advertising and the consumer, exploring the kind of fame and iconography that comes with American politics. With President Elect, Rosenquist seeks to make a statement on the new role that advertising and mass media had during the Kennedy's campaign. "I was very interested at that time in people who advertised themselves," said Rosenquist. "Why did they put up an advertisement of themselves? So that was his face. And his promise was half a Chevrolet and a piece of stale cake." In the painting, Rosenquist contrasts the portrait of Kennedy with the cake and the Chevrolet to show how each element is marketed to American consumers.

F-111: In 1965, James Rosenquist completed F-111, one of the largest and most ambitious works in his collection. Spanning over 83 feet and 23 canvases, the painting's scale evokes Rosenquist's work on billboards, illustrating a life-sized depiction of the F-111 Aardvark aircraft. The painting initially was intended to cover all four walls of the main room within the Castelli gallery in Manhattan, occupying the entirety of each wall without any kind of visual relief, to cast an imposing, continuous view of the war. Painted during the Vietnam war, F-111 contrasts pictures from the war with commercial imagery from advertisements, showing tires, a cake, lightbulbs, a girl in a salon hairdryer, bubbles, and spaghetti. Rosenquist juxtaposes the imagery from the ads against the plane as a way to imply graphic scenes from the war, with broken light bulbs near the cockpit mirroring bombs dropping from the plane, and the hood of the hairdryer echoing the look of a missile. Rosenquist uses the painting to question the role of marketing and coverage of the war describing the plane as "flying through the flak of consumer society to question the collusion between the Vietnam death machine, consumerism, the media, and advertising,".

Honors

Rosenquist received numerous honors, including selection as "Art In America Young Talent USA" in 1963, appointment to a six-year term on the Board of the National Council of the Arts in 1978, and receiving the Golden Plate Award from the American Academy of Achievement in 1988. In 2002, the Fundación Cristóbal Gabarrón conferred upon him its annual international award for art, in recognition of his contributions to universal culture.

Beginning with his first early-career retrospectives in 1972 organized by the Whitney Museum of American Art, New York City, and the Wallraf-Richartz Museum, Cologne, Rosenquist's work was the subject of several gallery and museum exhibitions, both in the United States and abroad. The Solomon R. Guggenheim Museum organized a full-career retrospective in 2003, which travelled internationally, and was organized by curators Walter Hopps and Sarah Bancroft.

His F-111, shown at The Jewish Museum in 1965, was mentioned in a chapter of Polaroids from the Dead by Douglas Coupland.

Personal life
Rosenquist married twice and had two children. With his first wife, Mary Lou Adams, whom he married on June 5, 1960, he had one child: John. His first marriage ended in divorce. In 1976, a year after his divorce, he moved to Aripeka, Florida. His second wife was Mimi Thompson, whom he married on April 18, 1987, by whom he had one child: Lily.

On April 25, 2009, a fire swept through Hernando County, Florida, where Rosenquist had lived for 30 years, burning his house, studios, and warehouse. All of his paintings stored on his property were destroyed, including art for an upcoming show.

Death
Rosenquist died at his home in New York City on March 31, 2017, after a long illness; he was 83 years old. His survivors include his wife, Thompson; one daughter, Lily; one son, John; and a grandson, Oscar.

References

External links

 Rosenquist's official site
 
 James Rosenquist in the National Gallery of Australia's Kenneth Tyler Collection
 Photographs of James Rosenquist by photographer Russ Blaise
 Interview with db artmag
 James Rosenquist Biography and Interview on American Academy of Achievement
 Pop Art Masters – James Rosenquist
 In the Studio: James Rosenquist
 Interview with Myartspace
 Exhibition The Hole in the Center of Time with the latest works at Jablonka Galerie, Berlin
 Rosenquist's Discover Graphics, the Smithsonian Art Collectors Program.
 James Rosenquist: A Retrospective at the Guggenheim Museum, New York City, 2003–04
 "Rosenquist Writ Large, by Himself", Dwight Garner, The New York Times, October 27, 2009
 BOMB Magazine interview with James Rosenquist by Mary Anne Staniszewski (Fall, 1987)
Rosenquist Rare Exhibition Posters on Rare Posters
James Rosenquist at the Jewish Museum.

1933 births
2017 deaths
American people of Swedish descent
American pop artists
20th-century American painters
American printmakers
University of Minnesota alumni
Members of the American Academy of Arts and Letters
Art Students League of New York alumni
People from Grand Forks, North Dakota
Artists from North Dakota
21st-century American painters
Painters from North Dakota